Tanaav is an Indian Hindi -language action thriller streaming series directed by Sudhir Mishra and Sachin Krishn. The series is created and produced by Sameer Nair under the banner of Applause Entertainment Pvt. Ltd, starring  Manav Vij, Arbaaz Khan, Danish Husain, Ekta Kaul, M. K. Raina, Rajat Kapoor, Satyadeep Mishra, Shashank Arora, Sumit Kaul, Sukhmani Sadana, Waluscha De Sousa and Zarina Wahab. Tanaav is a remake of the Israeli TV series Fauda, premiered on SonyLIV on 11 November 2022. The first season mentions Harkat-ul-Mujahideen, Jamaat-e-Islami Kashmir, Gulf money and moderate separatists.

Plot
Set in 2017, the socio-political drama revolves around the conflict between state-run Special Task Group (STG) and Pakistan based terrorists in the Kashmir Valley.

Cast 
Manav Vij as Kabir Farooqui
Sukhmani Sadana as Nusrat Farooqui
Rajat Kapoor- Jagjit Malik, bureaucrat
Arbaaz Khan as  Vikrant Rathore
Danish Husain
Rajesh Jais as NSA Dheeraj Saran
Ekta Kaul as Dr. Farah
Sahiba Bali as  Toshi Kaul
Amit Gaur as Muneer
M. K. Raina as Meer Saab
Satyadeep Mishra as Udar Parimoo
Sumit Kaul as Umar Riaz ‘Panther’
Shashank Arora as Junaid
Waluscha De Sousa as Zainab Riaz
Zarina Wahab as Nabeela Riaz, Umar Riaz's mother
Sheen Savita Dass as Fatima Ali
Mir Sarwar as Idris Lone

Production

Development 
In November 2019, content studio Applause Entertainment  announced that there will be an Indian remake of Fauda, titled Tanaav which will highlight the complicated relationship between India and Pakistan shot for 100 days in Kashmir, India.

Comparative Analysis with Fauda

Episodes

Season 1

Release 
The trailer of the series was released on 18 October 2022. The series consisting of twelve episodes released on 11 November 2022. scheduled to premiere on SonyLIV from 11 November 2022.

Marketing
Arbaz Khan, Waluscha De Sousa, Sudhir Mishra along with the cast promoted the web series on The Kapil Sharma Show. The cast of Tanaav also promoted the web series on Bigg Boss 16.

Reception
Tanaav received mixed reviews from critics. Archika Khurana of The Times of India praised Tanaav as a nail-biting espionage thriller set in Kashmir that moves at a breakneck pace throughout. Grace Cyril of India Today praised the web series for a compelling plot. Deepa Gahlot of Scroll.in praised the web series for an undoubtedly gripping thriller, and having relentless pace and striking visuals. Subhash K. Jha of The Firstpost mentioned that Tanaav is a partly-haunting, partly-jolting dream-turned-nightmare drama.

Abhimanyu Mathur of Hindustan times mentioned that the web series is well-intentioned but fails to capture nuances of Kashmir conflict. Arushi Jain of The Indian Express stated that the web series in an intriguing one. Zoya Bhatti of ThePrint praised Tanaav for cinematography, haunting background compositions, authentic Kashmiri dialogues. News18 stated that the web series is powerful and engaging.

See also 
 Special OPS
 Mukhbir - The Story of a Spy
 Hostages (web series)
 Kaafir (Indian TV series)
 Baby (2015 Hindi film)
 Call My Agent: Bollywood

References

External links 
 
 Tanaav on SonyLIV

Indian television series
Indian web series
2022 Indian television series debuts
2022 web series debuts
Action web series
Kashmir conflict in fiction
Television shows set in Jammu and Kashmir
Hindi-language television shows
Indian thriller television series